Sretensky Monastery  is an Orthodox monastery in Moscow, founded by Grand Prince Vasili I in 1397. It used to be located close to the present-day Red Square, but in the early 16th century it was moved northeast to what is now Bolshaya Lubyanka Street. The Sretensky Monastery gave its name to adjacent streets and byways, namely Sretenka Street, Sretensky Boulevard, Sretensky Lane, Sretensky Deadend, and Sretensky Gates Square. Sretensky Theological Academy is subordinated to the monastery.

History

Unlike most other Russian Orthodox churches of the same name the monastery is not, as might be expected, named after one of the twelve Great Feasts of Russian Orthodox Church Sretenie Gospodne (Presentation of Our Lord in the Temple), with Sretenie being a Church Slavonic word for "meeting".

The origin of the monastery's name comes from the fact that it was built on the spot where the muscovites and the ruling Prince had met the icon of Our Lady of Vladimir on August 26, 1395. It was being moved from Vladimir to Moscow to protect the capital from the imminent invasion of Tamerlane. Soon thereafter, the armies of Tamerlane retreated and the grateful monarch founded the monastery to commemorate the miracle.  In 1552, the Muscovites gathered at the walls of the monastery to meet the Russian army returning after the conquest of Kazan.

In 1925, the monastery was closed down. In 1928–1930, most of its buildings were dismantled by the Soviets, including the Church of Mary of Egypt (14th-16th century) and Church of Saint Nicholas (16th century). Only the  Cathedral of the Meeting of the Icon of Our Lady of Vladimir (собор Сретения Владимирской иконы Богоматери) with a side chapel to the Nativity of John the Forerunner (built in 1679 by the order of tsar Fyodor Alexeyevich) survived to this day.

Services in the Vladimirsky Cathedral resumed in 1991. The cathedral was transferred to the authority of the Pskovo-Pechorsky Monastery in 1994, but nowadays it is a separate monastic establishment, with Patriarch Kirill as its archimandrite. Since 1998 the Monastery is headed by Bishop Tikhon (Shevkunov) as the Patriarch's representative (namestnik).

The new church 
 
In November 2013, an official body that oversees construction on heritage sites approved the construction of a large "church on blood" dedicated to the New Martyrs and Confessors of the Russian Orthodox Church. The 61-metre-high building, fittingly situated next door to the infamous Lubyanka Prison, was completed in early 2017, in time for the 100th anniversary of the October Revolution when attacks on the Russian Orthodox Church had begun. Architectural preservationists voiced their concern that the outsize building would irrevocably alter the surrounding cityscape.

References

External links 
 English web-site of Sretensky monastery
 Official website

Monasteries in Moscow
Russian Orthodox monasteries in Russia
1397 establishments in Europe
14th-century churches in Russia
Christian monasteries established in the 14th century
Cultural heritage monuments of regional significance in Moscow